Therela Grama Niladhari Division is a Grama Niladhari Division of the Madulla Divisional Secretariat of Moneragala District of Uva Province, Sri Lanka. It has Grama Niladhari Division Code 113D.

Therela is a surrounded by the Dambagalla, Ellekona, Obbegoda, Iluklanda, Pagura and Galbokka Grama Niladhari Divisions.

Demographics

Ethnicity 
The Therela Grama Niladhari Division has a Sinhalese majority (99.4%). In comparison, the Madulla Divisional Secretariat (which contains the Therela Grama Niladhari Division) has a Sinhalese majority (99.9%)

Religion 
The Therela Grama Niladhari Division has a Buddhist majority (99.5%). In comparison, the Madulla Divisional Secretariat (which contains the Therela Grama Niladhari Division) has a Buddhist majority (99.4%)

References 

Grama Niladhari Divisions of Madulla Divisional Secretariat